Heinrich "Hein Daddel" Dahlinger (30 October 1922 – 2 February 2008) was a German world-class  field handball and team handball player and entrepreneur of a wood sale company. With his winning of the Nordic Folkboat Gold Cup on his boat the Daddel in 1963 he was the unofficial champion of Nordic Folkboat.

Dahlinger was the first THW Kiel player to score more than 100 goals on the German national team. He played 38 national team matches in total and scored more than 110 goals. With the German team he was world champion in field handball in 1952 and 1955.

Dahlinger was born in Kiel. He died of kidney failure in Rendsburg.

External links
Obituary 
Statistics

1922 births
2008 deaths
German male handball players
Sportspeople from Kiel
People from the Province of Schleswig-Holstein
Deaths from kidney failure
Nordic Folkboat class sailors